HMAS Southern Cross was an examination vessel, stores and troop carrier of the Royal Australian Navy (RAN) during the Second World War. Built in 1933 for the Melanesian Mission of the Anglican Church, she was requisitioned by the RAN on 29 March 1941 and commissioned on 18 June 1941.

Description
Southern Cross was a yacht that was launched as yard number 994 on 4 July 1933 by Cammell Laird & Company in Birkenhead, England.

Wartime Service

Deployment to Darwin
Southern Cross took Kiara in tow on 1 July when one of that ship's engines failed until moderating weather allowed Kiara to proceed on one engine until Brisbane was reached on 3 July where repairs were made to Kiara's engine. The ships sailed 6 July for Gladstone but another engine failure in Kiara required towing and taking an inshore route to avoid heavy seas offshore. On 9 July, after fueling, the ships departed Gladstone for Townsville with further engine breakdowns and towing during that transit. On reaching Townsville Kiara was placed on a slip for repairs and both ships were painted. On 15 July both ships sailed for Cairns, reached 16 July, where more engine repairs were made to Kiara's port engine and minor fire damage to wiring repaired in Southern Cross. After a picnic sponsored by the Cairns Junior Auxiliary Anzac Club and taking on extra fuel the ships departed 21 July for Thursday Island where Kiara took on fuel from the reserve in Southern Cross. On 27 July the ships sailed for Darwin but overheating in Southern Cross's starboard engine on 28 July required a stop and some repairs. At anchorage at Elcho Island the next day Kiara was fueled again from reserves in Southern Cross before the ships departed for Darwin. On 1 August the ships arrived at Darwin.

Darwin
Southern Cross, one of the vessels working the Darwin boom defense, was stationed near the boom when the Japanese bombed the port on 19 February 1942.

The ships sailed from Darwin at 3 a.m., 9 July, with troops of "Plover" force. After crossing the Arafura Sea the ships arrived off Dobo on at 2 a.m., 12 July and entered the harbor to land the force without opposition. Discharge of troops and cargo was completed on 13 July and Darwin was reached on 14 July.

On 28 July Southern Cross with  departed Darwin with Australian troops bound for Saumlaki but Japanese forces landed there on 30 July with occupation forces. The small Dutch force there mistook the Japanese ships for the Australian ships and were overrun before the Australian forces arrived. After successful landings the Japanese ships withdrew. Southern Cross suffered an engine casualty and was delayed with Chinampa entering the occupied harbor alone and attempting an unsuccessful landing. On arrival of Southern Cross both ships attempted to land the force but were met by heavy fire and withdrew. Both ships arrived with the troops at Darwin on 2 August 1942.

Citations

References

External links
Remarks of Ambassador Bleich at the AAA Plaque Unveiling at Darwin Military Museum, February 19, 2012  (U.S. Ambassador's remarks including accounts of USS Peary survivor and Southern Cross rescuer.)
 HMAS Chinampa (Royal Australian Navy web page on Chinampa with account of Saumlaki mission undertaken with Southern Cross.)

1933 ships
Ships built on the River Mersey
Troop ships of the Royal Australian Navy